Psilogramma villani is a moth of the  family Sphingidae. It is known from the Philippines.

References

Psilogramma
Moths described in 2000
Endemic fauna of the Philippines